The Round the Island Race is an annual yacht race around the Isle of Wight. It starts and finishes in Cowes, and is organised by the Island Sailing Club. It was first held in 1931, it was sponsored by JP Morgan Asset Management from 2005 but in 2017 Cloudy Bay took over as the Presenting Sponsor, the 2019 race was sponsored by Helly Hansen, Raymarine, MS Amlin and Chelsea Magazines. The race is generally chosen to be the Saturday in June with the most favourable tides; a date in late May or early July may be chosen if there is no suitable date in June.

History
The race was the idea of Major Cyril Windeler, who commissioned a gold Roman-style bowl as prize for the winner. The first race, in 1931, had 25 entries. The silver bowl second prize was introduced a few years later when Chris Ratsey impressed Windeler with his good sportsmanship. The last race before World War II, in 1939, attracted 80 entries.  In 2008 a total of 1750 boats took part. In 2022, more than 1100 boats took part.

Course

The course has varied slightly with buoys tried at the Needles and a requirement to leave No Man's Land Fort to port.

Race record

Multihull/outright race record
It was in 1961 that multihulls first entered the round the island race and the record has since fallen considerably.

Monohull race record

Outright record
The outright record as recognised by the World Speed Sailing Record Council on behalf of International Sailing Federation has in the past also been the race record.

Gallery

References

External links
 

Recurring sporting events established in 1931
Sailing competitions in the United Kingdom
Sailing in England
Sport on the Isle of Wight
Yachting races